Carlisle is a city in Lonoke County, Arkansas, United States. It is the easternmost municipality within the Little Rock–North Little Rock–Conway Metropolitan Statistical Area. Carlisle was incorporated in 1878. As of the 2010 census it had a population of 2,214.

Geography
Carlisle is located in eastern Lonoke County at  (34.786109, -91.744835). Interstate 40 passes through the northern side of the city, with access from Exit 183 (Highway 13). I-40 leads east  to Forrest City and west  to North Little Rock. U.S. Route 70 passes through the center of Carlisle as Park Street and serves as a local highway parallel to I-40. US-70 leads east  to Hazen and west the same distance to Lonoke, the county seat. Arkansas Highway 13 passes through the west side of Carlisle and leads north  to Hickory Plains and south  to Humnoke.

Bayou Two Prairie, a southeast-flowing tributary of Bayou Meto, touches the southwest corner of the city limits.

Demographics

2020 census

As of the 2020 United States census, there were 2,033 people, 896 households, and 637 families residing in the city.

2000 census
As of the census of 2000, there were 2,304 people, 955 households, and 645 families residing in the city. The racial makeup of the city was 86.28% White, 12.46% Black or African American, 0.52% Native American, 0.22% Asian, and 0.52% from two or more races.  0.56% of the population were Hispanic or Latino of any race.

There were 954 households, out of which 27.5% had children under the age of 18 living with them, 52.9% were married couples living together, 11.3% had a female householder with no husband present, and 32.4% were non-families. 29.9% of all households were made up of individuals, and 15.9% had someone living alone who was 65 years of age or older.  The average household size was 2.32 and the average family size was 2.87.

In the city, the population was spread out, with 22.9% under the age of 18, 7.5% from 18 to 24, 24.5% from 25 to 44, 24.8% from 45 to 64, and 20.3% who were 65 years of age or older.  The median age was 41 years. For every 100 females, there were 88.9 males.  For every 100 females age 18 and over, there were 80.8 males.

The median income for a household in the city was $30,086, and the median income for a family was $39,853. Males had a median income of $30,292 versus $20,563 for females. The per capita income for the city was $15,725.  About 10.5% of families and 15.5% of the population were below the poverty line, including 16.3% of those under age 18 and 26.7% of those age 65 or over.

Education 
Public education for early childhood, elementary and secondary school students is provided from:

 Carlisle School District (primary), which leads to graduation from Carlisle High School.
 Des Arc School District, which leads to graduation from Des Arc High School.

Notable people
Johnny Adams, jockey and racehorse trainer; born in Carlisle, raised in Iola, Kansas
Maurice Britt, Medal of Honor recipient from World War II; first Republican lieutenant governor of Arkansas since Reconstruction; born in Carlisle and reared in Lonoke
Mitch Petrus, former NFL offensive lineman for the New York Giants

References

External links
 Official website
 Carlisle (Lonoke County), Encyclopedia of Arkansas History & Culture

Cities in Arkansas
Cities in Lonoke County, Arkansas
Cities in Little Rock–North Little Rock–Conway metropolitan area
Populated places established in 1878
1878 establishments in Arkansas